The Kőszeg Mountains , sometimes called the Guns or Güns Mountains, are a mountain range in the Alpokalja area, the easternmost region of the Alps. The territory of the range is shared between Austria and Hungary. Its highest point is the Írott-kő (literally written stone) with a height of 884 metres.

References

See also 
 Geography of Hungary
 Alpokalja
 Güns (disambiguation)

Mountain ranges of Burgenland
Mountain ranges of Hungary
Oberpullendorf District
Oberwart District
Geography of Vas County
Kőszeg
Prealps East of the Mur
Pannonian island mountains